Stinks is the thirteenth studio album by King Creosote, released in 2000.

Track listing
Tongue In Groove  
Little Grown Ups  
Punchbag  
Sulphur Breeze  
X-reg Bartender  
For Pity's Sake  
Handful Of 78's  
Hellen  
Short & Sweet  
Ten Posts, Nine Gaps  
A Prairie Tale  
Happily Never After  
Small Child Bumps Her Head And Cries  
La Dc Di Dah  
Silence No More  
All Over Caroline
Heaven Colour Dyes  
Marie  Celeste  
Lost Again Billy

References

2000 albums
King Creosote albums